As of 2011, approximately 235 million people worldwide were affected by asthma, and roughly 250,000 people die per year from asthma-related causes. Low and middle income countries make up more than 80% of the mortality. Rates vary between countries with prevalences between 1 and 18%. It is more common in developed than developing countries. Rates are lower in Asia, Eastern Europe, and Africa. Within developed countries it is more common among those who are economically disadvantaged while in contrast in developing countries it is more common amongst the affluent. The reason for these differences is not well known.

While asthma is twice as common in boys as girls, severe asthma occurs at equal rates. Among adults, however, asthma is twice as common in women as men.

Increasing frequency

Rates of asthma have increased significantly between the 1960s and 2008  with it being recognized as a major public health problem since the 1970s. Some 9% of US children had asthma in 2001, compared with just 3.6% in 1980. The World Health Organization (WHO) reports that some 10% of the Swiss population have asthma as of 2007, compared with 2% some 25–30 years ago. In the United States the age-adjusted prevalence of asthma increased from 7.3 to 8.2 percent during the years 2001 through 2009.

Region specific data

United States
Asthma affects approximately 7% of the population of the United States and causes approximately 4,210 deaths per year. In 2005, asthma affected more than 22 million people, including 6 million children, and accounted for nearly 500,000 hospitalizations that same year. In 2010, asthma accounted for more than one-quarter of admitted emergency department visits in the U.S. among children aged 1–9 years, and it was a frequent diagnosis among children aged 10–17 years. From 2000 through 2010, the rate of pediatric hospital stays for asthma declined from 165 to 130 per 100,000 population, respectively, whereas the rate for adults remained about 119 per 100,000 population.

Asthma prevalence in the U.S. is higher than in most other countries in the world, but varies drastically between ethnic populations. Asthma prevalence is highest in Puerto Ricans, Latino, African Americans, Filipinos, Irish Americans, and Native Hawaiians, and lowest in Mexicans and Koreans. Rates of asthma-related hospital admissions in 2010 were more than three times higher among African American children and two times higher for African American and Latino adults compared with White and Asian and Pacific Islander people. Also, children who are born in low-income families have higher risk of asthma.

Asthma prevalence also differs between populations of the same ethnicity who are born and live in different places. U.S.-born Mexican populations, for example, have higher asthma rates than non-U.S. born Mexican populations that are living in the U.S.

United Kingdom
Asthma affects approximately 5% of the United Kingdom's population. In England, an estimated 261,400 people were newly diagnosed with asthma in 2005; 5.7 million people had an asthma diagnosis and were prescribed 32.6 million asthma-related prescriptions.

Canada 
Data depicts an increasing trend in asthma prevalence among Canada's population. In 2000-2001 asthma prevalence was monitored at 6.5%; by 2010-2011 a 4.3% increase was shown, with asthma prevalence totaling 10.8% of Canada's population.

Furthermore, asthma prevalence varies among the provinces of Canada; the highest prevalence is Ontario at 12.1%, and the lowest is Nunavut at 3.8%. Though there is an overall decrease in the incidence of new asthma cases in Canada, prevalence is rising. This can be attributed to a decrease in case-specific mortality due to improved management and control of asthma and its symptoms.

Latin and Central America 
It is approximated that 40 million Latin Americans live with asthma.

In some reports, urban residency within Latin America has been found to be associated with an increased prevalence of asthma. Childhood asthma prevalence was found to be higher than 15 percent in a majority of Latin American countries. Similarly, a study published relating to asthma prevalence in Havana, Cuba estimated that approximately 9 percent of children under the age of 15 are undiagnosed for asthma, possible due to lack of resources in the region.

Japan 
The prevalence of asthma in adults in Japan is rapidly increasing, however there is a significant difference for the children in Japan. The mean prevalence of asthma in Japan has increased from about 1% to 10% or higher in children and to about 6–10% in adults since the 1960s. There has been a 1.5 fold increase in the prevalence of asthma per decade in Japan from the 1960s. Three surveys done from 1985, 1999 and 2006 show adult asthma is increasing, while the same surveys indicate that the prevalence of asthma in children is decreasing. To compare this to another Asia-Pacific country the estimated prevalence of asthma in male and female children in Mongolia in a 2009 ISSAC study was 20.9% and 21.0%

Asia 
Data regarding the epidemiology of asthma in the continent of Asia as whole is scarce, particularly regarding adult populations. However, similarly to much of the rest of the globe, prevalence of childhood asthma appears to be rising. Systematic childhood studies, such as the International Study of Asthma and Allergies in Childhood (ISAAC), provide data regarding the epidemiology of asthma among Asia's youth population. Asthma prevalence among Asia's adult population is less clear in comparison due to the comparatively higher monitoring of younger populations. However, the data available points to a positive correlation between age and asthma prevalence. Findings indicate that the prevalence of asthma among the Asian adult population is less than 5%; while findings pertaining to elderly populations illustrate a rate somewhere between 1.3 and 15.3%.

International migration
In a review of studies on the prevalence of asthma among migrant populations, those born in high-income countries were found to have higher rates of asthma than migrants. Second-generation migrants had a higher risk of asthma than first-generation migrants, and the prevalence of asthma increases with longer time of residence in the host country. This confirms the role of the environment in the development of asthma.

Regional differences 
A survey conducted by the ISSAC Steering Committee conducted a study from 1992 to 1993 in adults aged 22 to 44 comparing the prevalence of asthma in 10 developed countries. An important note to consider is the population differences between these countries. The United States population in 1992 was 256.9 million, 14.5 times that of Australia (17.5 mil), and 4.5 times of the United Kingdom (57.51 mil). However, Australia and the UK have a higher prevalence than the US by 2.4 times on the lower end and 4.6 times on the higher end. In another study taken in 1992 for Japan the prevalence of asthma in Japan was 13% with a population of 124.2 million.

Prevalence of asthma (4th column) in 11 different countries

(1st column) between the years 1992 and 1994 (2nd column)

in the ages 20–44 (3rd column) including Japan in 2005

Social determinants 
Differences in socioeconomic status has shown disparities among the prevalence of asthma across populations. In the United States, socioeconomic status is associated with race, due to population trends, Black and Hispanic populations are more likely to have asthma, due to higher concentrations in low-income areas. In other areas of the world, the same trend that lower socioeconomic status is related to higher severity of asthma symptoms. Airway reactivity and symptoms for children of low socioeconomic status in Canada tend to be higher than those of higher-income areas. The contrast between residents of rural and suburban areas can be seen in a study of Kenya and Ethiopia,  where prevalence of asthma is lower in rural areas, and higher in urban areas. A similar trend can be seen in the United States, where an urban-rural gradient shows the increase in the prevalence of asthma closer to the inner city.

A study published by BMC Pulmonary Medicine shows the relation between those who live in large urban, small urban, and rural areas. Large urban can be classified as the inner-city, and small urban is related to suburban areas. The inner city and rural communities have several commonalities that are important when determining socioeconomic status. They are both more likely to have higher poverty rates, and higher mortality rates, thus having a lower health status than suburban residents. It was found that asthma prevalence in large urban areas was 20.9%, small urban was 21.5%, and rural was 15.1%. However, it is important to acknowledge that rural residents experienced more asthma-like symptoms (wheezing, whistling, and coughing) than those in urban areas, rural residents had 5% more asthma like symptoms. Also, residents in large urban areas were less likely to use medical services for asthma symptoms.

Multiple factors contribute to socioeconomic disparities, income and education, pollutant exposures and allergens are uncontrollable influences on an individual. Stressors related to neighborhood violence and safety, behavioral risk factors, and lack of access to adequate medications and healthcare also contribute to an increased prevalence of asthma. Low income alone accounts for a significant increase in poor asthma outcomes, including severity, lung function, and morbidity rates.

Secondhand smoke is a common exposure for asthmatic children in low-income households. Children who live with at least one smoker are more likely to have asthma than those who don't. People living below the poverty line and with less education have a higher second-hand smoke exposure than those who do not. Also, those with blue-collar jobs are more likely to be exposed at work, as well as those with service jobs (servers and bartenders) are exposed to smoke at businesses that do not have smoking restrictions.

Gender 
Globally, there are 136 million women with asthma, 57% of the 235 million people living with asthma. In addition to being more common among women, women experience more severe symptoms and are more likely to die from asthma. The severity and frequency of asthma complications is related to both gender and age. Although asthma is more prevalent and more severe in boys among children, many women experience a significant worsening of symptoms around and after puberty. The timing of the change in prevalence and severity around puberty suggest that asthma pathogenesis is related to sex hormones or hormone levels.

Between 2014-15 and 2019-20 more than 5,100 women in the United Kingdom died from an asthma attack compared with fewer than 2,300 men. Based on emergency hospital admissions in England, among all admissions 20 to 49 years old, women were 2.5 times more likely to be admitted to hospital for asthma treatment compared with men.

Notes

References

 
 
 

Asthma
Asthma